Flavobacterium aciduliphilum  is a Gram-negative, rod-shaped and non-motil bacterium from the genus of Flavobacterium which has been isolated from freshwater from a lake in Jeollabuk-do in Korea.

References

 

aciduliphilum
Bacteria described in 2013